Spanish general strike may refer to:

 1917 Spanish general strike
 1919 Spanish general strike
 1988 Spanish general strike
 2010 Spanish general strike
 2017 Catalan general strike